Make Your Own Bed is a 1944 American comedy film directed by Peter Godfrey and written by Francis Swann, Edmund Joseph and Richard Weil. The film stars Jack Carson, Jane Wyman, Irene Manning, Alan Hale, Sr., George Tobias and Robert Shayne. The film was released by Warner Bros. on June 10, 1944.

Plot
Wealthy and eccentric Walter Whirtle (Alan Hale) and his wife Vivian (Irene Manning) can't seem to keep servants at their country estate.  Whirtle, having insulted a policeman, is jailed, and meets inept (and newly-fired) private detective Jerry Curtis (Jack Carson), who had arrested the district attorney. Claiming that he is being stalked by Nazi spies, Walter hires Jerry to pose as his butler and Jerry's long-suffering fiancée Susan Courtney (Jane Wyman) to pose as his cook and investigate.  He also hires a cast of German radio actors to portray the spies and string Jerry and Susan along. Other elements of intrigue develop when Walter suspects Vivian of carrying on an affair, and Susan sees Jerry landed in a series of compromising situations.

Cast 
 Jack Carson as Jerry Curtis
 Jane Wyman as Susan Courtney
 Irene Manning as Vivian Whirtle
 Alan Hale, Sr. as Walter Whirtle
 George Tobias as Boris Fenilise
 Robert Shayne as Mike Knight
 Tala Birell as Marie Gruber
 Ricardo Cortez as Wilson 
 Marjorie Hoshelle as Miss Elsa Wehmer
 Kurt Katch as Herr von Ritter

References

External links 
 
 
 
 

1944 films
Warner Bros. films
American comedy films
1944 comedy films
Films directed by Peter Godfrey
Films scored by Heinz Roemheld
American black-and-white films
1940s English-language films
1940s American films